Edoardo Bove (born 16 May 2002) is an Italian professional footballer who plays as a midfielder for Serie A club Roma.

Early life 
Edoardo Bove was born in Rome. Bove's paternal branch of his family is originally from Naples, while his maternal branch is also made up of people of German origin. Bove grew up in the quartiere of Appio-Latino, and studied at the Massimo Institute in Rome's neighborhood EUR. Subsequently, he continued his studies at Luiss 'Guido Carli', in Rome, enrolling in a degree course in Economics and Management. In an interview, Bove stated that he was inspired by Roma's former captain Daniele De Rossi.

Club career 
Bove started playing football in the Roman club of Boreale Donorione until 2012, when he joined Roma after following a successful trial under the supervision of Bruno Conti. On 20 November 2020, Bove extended his contract with Roma unitil 2024. Bove was first called up by the first team on 3 December for a Europa League match against Young Boys without making his debut. Bove made his professional debut for Roma on the 9 May 2021, replacing Ebrima Darboe in the second half of a 5–0 Serie A win against Crotone at the Stadio Olimpico. In the 2021–22 season, Bove was often called up by Roma's coach José Mourinho. He made his first Conference League match on 9 December as a starter in a 3–2 win against CSKA Sofia. On 29 December, Roma announced that his contract would be extended until 2025. On 19 February 2022, Bove scored his first senior goal allowing Roma draw 2–2 against Verona.

Style of play 
Bove is a mezz'ala or trequartista good at offensive insertions and tactically disciplined, he also has a good technique as an eye for the goal.

Career statistics

Honours 
Roma
 UEFA Europa Conference League: 2021–22

References

External links

AS Roma profile

2002 births
Living people
Italian footballers
Italian people of German descent
Italy youth international footballers
Association football midfielders
Footballers from Rome
A.S. Roma players
Serie A players
UEFA Europa Conference League winning players